The Peek'n Peak Classic was a golf tournament on the Nationwide Tour. It was played from 2002 to 2007 on the Upper Course of Peek'n Peak Resort in Findley Lake, New York, United States.

The 2007 purse was $600,000, with $108,000 going to the winner.

After nine years, the Web.com Tour returned to the resort for the LECOM Health Challenge.

Winners

Bolded golfers graduated to the PGA Tour via the final Nationwide Tour money list.

References

External links
PGATOUR.com tournament website

Former Korn Ferry Tour events
Golf in New York (state)
Recurring sporting events established in 2002
Recurring sporting events disestablished in 2007
2002 establishments in New York (state)
2007 disestablishments in New York (state)